Ihud Bnei Majd al-Krum is an Israeli football club based in Majd al-Krum. They are currently in Liga Alef North division. The club is part of Hapoel Association.

History
The club was founded in 2008, in order to revive football in Majd al-Krum, after Hapoel Majd al-Krum folded, following their relegation from Liga Artzit, the third tier of Israeli football at the time, in the 2004–05 season.

In their first season of existence, the club won Liga Gimel Upper Galilee division, and were promoted to Liga Bet.

In the 2013–14 season, the club won Liga Bet North A division. However, as they finished equal on points with runners-up, Hapoel Kafr Kanna, a decisive match for promotion was held, which ended in 1–1 draw after extra time, and won 4–3 on penalties by Ihud Bnei Majd al-Krum, which were promoted to Liga Alef.

Honours

League

Cups

1 as Hapoel Majd al-Krum

External links
Ihud Bnei Majd al-Krum The Israel Football Association

References

Majd al-Krum
Association football clubs established in 2008
2008 establishments in Israel
Arab-Israeli football clubs